iD is a free software online editor for OpenStreetMap (OSM) geodata created in JavaScript and released in 2013. It is the most popular and the default editor on the main OSM page. iD's features include choosing custom aerial imagery and native support for Mapillary photos. Specialized forks of iD include RapiD, developed by Facebook as an import tool for reviewing and adding roads detected by proprietary Facebook algorithms.

History 
Prior to iD, the primary web editor for OpenStreetMap data was the Flash-based Potlatch 2 editor. The iD editor project was founded by the author of Potlatch 1 and 2, Richard Fairhurst, online on July 13, 2012 and at the State of the Map conference on October 14, 2012.

In September 2012, the Knight Foundation announced the winners of the Knight News Challenge: Data competition. The team from Development Seed/Mapbox was selected as a winner for their proposal to develop new contribution tools for OpenStreetMap, and awarded a grant of $575,000.

This editor was meant to be a Potlatch 2 architecture reimplementation in JavaScript with redesigned user interface. The only big internal change was departure from XML tagging preset architecture to a JSON-based one.

In 2013, iD became the default editor on OSM.org making it the most used OSM editor by changeset count.

Forks 
iD has spawned several forks for specialized use cases. In 2018, Facebook created RapiD for the MapWithAI initiative. RapiD gives users machine learning generated roads and buildings for verification before uploading to OSM.

References

External links 

 

Free GIS software
OpenStreetMap